The 1st Goya Awards were presented at the Teatro Lope de Vega, Madrid on 17 March 1987, and was presented by Fernando Rey.

Voyage to Nowhere won the award for Best Film.

Winners and nominees

Major award nominees

Other award nominees

Honorary Goya
José F. Aguayo

References

01
1986 film awards